"Maybe" is a song by New Zealand singer and songwriter Sharon O'Neill. The song was released in September 1981 as the second single from her third studio album, Maybe (1981). The song became O'Neill's second top twenty single in New Zealand following "Don't Say No to Tomorrow" in 1979.

Track listing 
7" (BA 222863)
Side A "Maybe" – 3:27
Side B "Long Distance From Singapore" – 4:33

Charts

References 

1981 songs
1981 singles
Sharon O'Neill songs
Songs written by Sharon O'Neill